The tench is a species of fish.  Tench may also refer to:

People
 Benmont Tench, musician
 Bobby Tench, British musician
 Watkin Tench, British marine officer

Other
 Tench language
 Tench Island, an island in the Saint Matthias Islands, Papua New Guinea

See also
 Tench class submarine
 Tench (EP), an EP by Shriekback
 Dead Man film character named Benmont Tench, played by actor Jared Harris